Pokémon: Black & White is the fourteenth season of the Pokémon anime series and the first and titular season of Pokémon the Series: Black & White, known in Japan as  . It originally aired in Japan from September 23, 2010, to September 15, 2011, on TV Tokyo channel 7, and in the United States from February 12, 2011, to January 7, 2012, on Cartoon Network. Brock and Dawn have left the series, and Ash Ketchum is joined by a new female trainer named Iris and a new male trainer named Cilan. The evil syndicate Team Rocket has a part to play in this season, and Jessie, James, and Meowth have been promoted.



Overview 

To promote the series and the episode where Ash obtains an egg, Pokémon Black and White players were able to obtain an egg containing either an Axew, a Pansage or a Pidove exclusively at US Toys "R" Us stores between April 27, 2011, and May 31, 2011. Each one contained their moves like anime counterparts (Ash's Pidove, Cilan's Pansage and Iris' Axew). Players were only able to get one egg and which of the Pokémon the egg hatched into was random.

Episode list

Music 
The Japanese opening song is "Best Wishes!" (ベストウイッシュ!, Besuto Uisshu!) by Rika Matsumoto. The first 2 episodes in Japan did not have the ending song, instead, the instrumental songs from Pokémon: Black & White Japanese Anime Sound Collection serve as ending songs during the original broadcast. The ending songs are "Fanfare of the Heart" (心のファンファーレ, Kokoro no Fanfāre) by Aki Okui starting in episode 3 during the original broadcast, and starting in episode 1 on DVD, "Can You Name All the Pokémon? BW" (ポケモン言えるかな? BW ビーダブリュー, Pokémon Ierukana? BW) by Takeshi Tsuruno, and the English opening song is "Black and White" by Erin Bowman and Joe Philips. Its instrumental version serves as the ending theme.

Home media releases 
Viz Media and Warner Home Video have released the series on DVD in the United States on four two-disc volume sets that contain 12 episodes each.

The first volume was released on November 20, 2012, The second was released on January 22, 2013, The third was released on March 19, 2013, and the fourth was released on May 14, 2013.

Viz Media and Warner Home Video released Pokémon: Black & White – The Complete Season on DVD on July 27, 2021.

Notes

References

External links 
 Pokémon anime website at TV Tokyo 
 Pocket Monsters: Best Wishes! website at TV Tokyo 
 Pokémon TV Anime at Pokémon JP official website 

2010 Japanese television seasons
2011 Japanese television seasons
Season14